Liu Jie (born January 1970) is a Chinese politician and member of the Chinese Communist Party (CCP), who is currently serving as CCP secretary of Hangzhou from December 2021.

Early life and education
Liu was born on 1970 in the city of Danyang in Jiangsu Province. From September 1988 to August 1992, he studied in the Department of Metallurgy at the University of Science and Technology Beijing, majoring in iron and steel metallurgy. In 2003, he studied at the Wuhan University of Science and Technology, where he majored in iron and steel metallurgy, and obtained a master's degree in engineering.

In 2008, he majored in resource industry economics and earned the Doctor of Engineering at the China University of Geosciences in Wuhan.

Industrial career
From August 1992 to December 2003, he worked at the Xiangtan Iron and Steel Company in Hunan, where he worked as technician, deputy director of the converter workshop, deputy director and director of the company's steelmaking plants.

Liu served as the assistant to the general manager and director of the steelmaking plant of the Xiangtan Iron and Steel Company from March 2003 to July 2003 and assistant to the general manager of the Xianggang Business Department of Hunan Valin Pipeline Co. Ltd., from September 2000 to 2003.

Political career

Hunan
From August 2008 to June 2011, he served as the director of the Hunan Provincial Department of Commerce and from June 2011 to December 2011, he served as the director of the Hunan Provincial Department of Commerce, and the deputy secretary of the Party Working Committee of Chang-Zhu-Tan.

Jiangxi
In December 2011, he appointed as Deputy Secretary and Mayor of Xinyu Municipal Committee and in August 2013, he served as Secretary of the Xinyu Municipal Party Committee of Jiangxi Province. From September 2016 to November 2016, he served as the Deputy Secretary-General of the Jiangxi Provincial Party Committee (at the department level).

From November 2016 to May 2018, he served as a member of the Standing Committee and Secretary-General of the Jiangxi Provincial Party Committee.

Guizhou
From May 2018 to July 2020, Liu served as a member of the Standing Committee of the Guizhou Provincial Party Committee and Secretary-General of the Provincial Party Committee. He later served the minister of the Organization Department, as well as the president of the Party School of the Guizhou Provincial Party Committee and the President of the Guizhou School of Administration from July 2020 to September 2020.

Zhejiang
In December 2021, following the stepping down of Zhou Jiangyong due to investigation on him by the Central Commission for Discipline Inspection (CCDI), Liu succeeded Zhou as the CCP secretary of Hangzhou following a decision of the meeting by the leading party cadres within the Hangzhou Municipal Party Committee.

Liu was also appointed as a member of the Zhejiang Provincial Party Committee, a member of the Standing Committee and the Secretary of the Hangzhou Municipal Party Committee. On 26 February 2022, the 13th Hangzhou Municipal Committee of the CCP held its first plenary meeting, and Liu was elected Secretary of the Municipal Party Committee.

References

Living people
1970 births
Chinese Communist Party politicians from Jiangsu
People's Republic of China politicians from Jiangsu
Standing Members of the Jiangxi Party Standing Committee
Political office-holders in Hunan
Political office-holders in Zhejiang
Political office-holders in Guizhou
People from Danyang
Politicians from Zhenjiang
University of Science and Technology Beijing alumni
Wuhan University of Technology alumni
China University of Geosciences alumni